The Blue Line (Line 2) of the Lucknow Metro is an approved metro route of mass rapid transit system in Lucknow.

List of stations
Following is a list of stations on this route:

See also

Lucknow
Uttar Pradesh
List of Lucknow Metro stations
Red Line (Lucknow Metro)
Uttar Pradesh Metro Rail Corporation
Uttar Pradesh State Road Transport Corporation
List of rapid transit systems in India
List of Metro Systems
Timeline of Lucknow Metro

References

External links

 

Lucknow Metro lines